Choi Jin-yi, (Hangul: 최진이; born December 13, 1982), better known by the stage name Rumble Fish (Hangul: 럼블피쉬), is a South Korean singer-songwriter. She was the main vocalist of Rumble Fish from 2004 to 2010. In 2010, she began her solo career with her debut EP, "I Am Me."

Personal life 
After seven years of dating, Choi married Buzz's guitarist, Yoon Woo-hyun, on March 26, 2017.

Discography

Extended plays

Soundtrack appearances

As featuring artist

References

1982 births
Living people
South Korean women pop singers
South Korean female idols
21st-century South Korean singers
21st-century South Korean women singers